Our Lady of the Holy Rosary Church is a former Roman Catholic parish in Tacoma, Washington, within the Archdiocese of Seattle. The church is a landmark of the city seen by travelers along Interstate 5.

The parish was established in 1891 by Bishop Egidius Junger when he invited Benedictine monks from St. John's Abbey in Minnesota to serve Tacoma's German-speaking population. The parish remained under the pastorship of the Benedictine monks until 1998.

The current church building was built in 1920 after the original wooden church was deemed unsafe. In 2018, the church building sustained water damage and sheetrock from the ceiling fell onto the choir loft and back pews. The building was deemed unsafe and masses were moved into the parish school auditorium. As the parish could not afford the $18 million necessary to repair the building, Archbishop J. Peter Sartain decreed in 2019 that the century-old church building be razed. The parish school moved to Fife, Washington, in 2020, as part of the parish's planned merge with St. Martin of Tours Parish. As the future of the parish was deemed unviable, Archbishop Paul D. Etienne ordered all services and ministries of the parish to cease at the end of August 2020.

On July 1, 2021, Holy Rosary Parish was amalgamated and merged into neighboring St. Ann Parish.

References

External links

Holy Rosary Church
Holy Rosary Bilingual Academy
Save Tacoma's Landmark Church campaign

Roman Catholic churches in Washington (state)
Roman Catholic Archdiocese of Seattle
Churches in Tacoma, Washington
1891 establishments in Washington (state)
2021 disestablishments in Washington (state)
Roman Catholic churches completed in 1920
20th-century Roman Catholic church buildings in the United States